Monaghan United F.C. is an Irish association football club based in Monaghan currently playing in the Ulster Senior League. The club joined the League of Ireland in 1983 and subsequently went on to play in the B Division, the First Division and the Premier Division. They resigned from the league midway through the 2012 season. The club continued to field a women's team in the Dublin Women's Soccer League and, together with the Cavan Monaghan Underage League, they entered a combined team in the League of Ireland U13 Division, League of Ireland U15, U17 and the U19 League of Ireland Divisions, until 2020, whereupon the partnership was ended, the CMUL continued to field a team in the national underage leagues. In 2019 the club entered a senior team into the Monaghan Cavan League, and in 2021, the club joined the Ulster Senior League.

History

League of Ireland
Monaghan United were founded in 1979. Among the club's founding members was Sean McCaffrey who was also the manager of the club when they joined the League of Ireland B Division in 1983–84. In 1985–86 Monaghan United became founder members of the League of Ireland First Division. United played eight seasons in the First Division before winning their first promotion. After finishing third in 1992–93 they became the first League of Ireland club to gain promotion via a promotion/relegation play off. They defeated Waterford United 5–2 on aggregate and were subsequently promoted to the 1993–94 Premier Division. They survived just two seasons in the Premier Division before being relegated at the end of the 1994–95 season. Monaghan United gained promotion to the Premier Division for a second time in 2000–01 after finishing second to Dundalk. This time their stay in the Premier Division last just one season. After managing to win just two league games, they finished last and were relegated following the conclusion of the 2001–02 season.  Monaghan United reached the final of the 2010 League of Ireland Cup but lost 1–0 in the final to Sligo Rovers. They also finished third in the 2010 First Division and qualified for the promotion/relegation play off. They subsequently beat Waterford United before losing to Bray Wanderers on penalties. In 2011, under the management of Roddy Collins,  Monaghan United again qualified for the promotion/relegation play off. This time they won promotion after beating Galway United  5–1 on aggregate.
However, midway through the 2012 season, Monaghan United withdrew from the league for "mainly but not only financial" reasons.

Statistics

Dublin Women's Soccer League
Monaghan United formed a ladies football team in 2006. They won Division Four of the Dublin Women's Soccer League in their first season and were promoted to Division Two. In 2007 they again won the league along with the Leinster Junior Cup. In 2008 they won the DWSL Intermediate Cup after defeating Santry 3–1 in the final. In 2012 they reached the semi-finals of the WFAI Intermediate Cup.

Monaghan Cavan League
In 2019, Monaghan United formed a senior team to play in the Monaghan Cavan League First Division. They finished off their debut season by winning the Sean Woods Cup and Jimmy Smith Shield Cup in September 2020, beating Glaslough Villa in both finals.

Ulster Senior League

2021 saw Monaghan United join the Ulster Senior League, the first club from Cavan or Monaghan to do so. In 2022, The Mons decided to withdraw from the league to continue football in the MCL.

Grounds
Monaghan United originally played their home games at Belgium Park which served as their home ground between 1979 and 1988. Since 1988 they have played at Gortakeegan, the first ever game being against Drogheda United in the 1988-89 League Cup.

Honours
Men
League of Ireland Cup
Runners Up: 2010: 1
League of Ireland First Division
Runners Up: 2000–01: 1
Sean Woods Cup
Winners: 2019-20: 1
Jimmy Smith Shields Cup
Winners: 2019-20: 1
Women
DWSL Intermediate Cup
Winners: 2008: 1

Notable former players

Internationals
Republic of Ireland internationals
  Jonathan Douglas

League of Ireland XI representatives

  Mick Byrne
  John Coady 
  Joe Hanrahan 
  Brian Mooney

Republic of Ireland B internationals
  Brian Mooney

Republic of Ireland U23 internationals
  Derek McGrath
  Brian Mooney 
  Stephen Rice

Republic of Ireland U21 internationals

Republic of Ireland U19 internationals
  Robert Bayly
  Ricky McEvoy

Republic of Ireland U17 internationals
  David Freeman
  John Lester
  Ger Robinson

Other Internationals
  Alvin Rouse

Goal scorers
First Division Top Scorer 

Most League Goals in a Season

Most League Goals

Others
 Paddy Andrews – All-Ireland football winner with Dublin

Managers
  Sean McCaffrey
  Bobby Browne (1999–2003)
  Mick Cooke (2003–11)
  Roddy Collins (2011–12)

References 

 
Association football clubs in Ulster
Association football clubs established in 1979
Former League of Ireland clubs
Former League of Ireland Premier Division clubs
Former League of Ireland First Division clubs
League of Ireland B Division clubs
Monaghan (town)
Sports clubs in County Monaghan
1979 establishments in Ireland
Dublin Women's Soccer League teams